"44 Minutes" is a song by the American heavy metal band Megadeth, which appears on their twelfth studio album, titled Endgame, which was released on September 15, 2009, written by frontman Dave Mustaine. The third song on the album, the song's lyrics portray the events of the North Hollywood shootout, that occurred in the North Hollywood district of Los Angeles on February 28, 1997.

Development
"44 Minutes" is based on the infamous North Hollywood shootout. The title of the song itself is derived directly from the film 44 Minutes: The North Hollywood Shoot-Out, an FX Network original film that was also based on the event, referring to the 44 Minutes of the duration of the shootout. The song is not the first piece of music to be based on the event, the album North Hollywood Shootout by the jam band Blues Traveler was also based on the incident, but took more liberties with their interpretation.

On the morning of February 2, 1997, Larry Phillips, Jr. and Emil Mătăsăreanu, both who were on barbiturate phenobarbital, attempted to rob the Bank of America, possessing two modified Romanian AIMS assault rifles, an AK-47 style rifle, and one modified Norinco Type 56 S-1, a semi automatic HK91, a modified Bushmaster XM15 E2S and their getaway vehicle. After listening to their radio scanners, the two walked into the bank, and forced the assistant manager to open the vault after firing several rounds. Due to an alteration of the delivery schedule, the bank only carried $303,305, which the two took with them when they fled through the north doorway. They faced dozens of LAPD police officers and SWAT commanders, who the duo shot at extensively, injuring 19 people. Ultimately, after a long shootout between the police and the perpetrators, both Phillips and Mătăsăreanu failed to get away with the money and were killed. Phillips died of his self-inflicted gunshot wound to the head, and bled to death before medical assistance could be brought to his aid, and Mătăsăreanu was shot 29 times in the shins and feet and died from trauma due to loss of blood. A majority of the event was broadcast live by news helicopters.

Lyrical meaning
The song documents the incident, and contains several direct references to the event. The incident began its timeframe at 9:17 a.m., which actually is "shortly past 9:00 AM", a line from the song that pays tribute to the facts of the event. In the song, there is "the fateful duo" that represents there were two perpetrators, who were "heavily sedated with thousands of rounds" with "armor piercing, fully automatic weapons", both of which are lines from the song. AK-47s and AR-15s, were also both referenced in the song and used during the event, and the portion that describes the shooting of "Achilles' heel" refers to how Mătăsăreanu was shot 29 times in the shins and feet. Furthermore, to guarantee full attention to detail, actual AK-47s were used as sound effects throughout the song, as stated by Dave Mustaine himself, "Underneath that snare, we're using a sample of an AK-47. It's a gun salute, where they do fire squad. These are things that you hear with records, and you go, 'Wow, this is great. I never would have heard this before.

Reception
Endgame was very well reviewed, and some of the praise was directed to "44 Minutes". In a song by song review of the album, Terrybezer of Metal Hammer praised the song and remarked that "A stirring, epic intro (complete with a cop's radio reporting a crime in progress) gives way to a jarring, stomping riff that dominates the verse and is followed by a huge melodic chorus and even more fret-frying lead guitar work." Peter Hodgson of "iheartguitar" was positive of the song and wrote that "44 Minutes might remind some listeners of the balance of melody and aggression displayed on Countdown To Extinction tracks like "Symphony Of Destruction" and "Architecture of Aggression" but with the added heaviness that seems to come from just being in the mere presence of such an intense track of "This Day We Fight!." Stephanie Burkett from BBC Music described the track as demonstration of the band's "commitment to pushing the modern metal envelope, not through the employment of any flashy tricks or gimmicks, but by perfecting the thrash genre".

Personnel
Megadeth
Dave Mustaine – Vocals, lead guitar, rhythm guitar, piano, acoustic guitars
Chris Broderick – Lead, rhythm, and acoustic guitars
James LoMenzo – Bass guitar
Shawn Drover – Drums and percussion

Production
Produced by Andy Sneap and Dave Mustaine
Engineered, mixed, and mastered by Andy Sneap
Additional recording by Dave Mustaine
Solo – Broderick
Solo – Mustaine
Lyrics & Music – Mustaine

See also
North Hollywood shootout
 44 Minutes: The North Hollywood Shoot-Out – film based on the event
 "The Right to Go Insane" – another Megadeth song based on a criminal act that culminated in the death of the perpetrator
 North Hollywood Shootout (Blues Traveler 2008 Album)

References

External links
Video via Youtube

Lyrics on official Megadeth website

Megadeth songs
2010 singles
Songs written by Dave Mustaine

pt:44 Minutes